Mikrolimni (before 1928: Λάγκα – Lagka) is a village in the Florina Regional Unit in West Macedonia, Greece.

Demographics 
Mikrolimni had 71 inhabitants in 1981. In fieldwork done by Riki Van Boeschoten in late 1993, Mikrolimni was populated by Slavophones.

References

External links
Prespes website

Populated places in Florina (regional unit)